Kalnai (literally Lithuanian: 'the mountains', Polish: Górajce) is a neighborhood of Vilnius located in the Antakalnis Eldership. It is situated northeast from the city center and southwest from Dvarčionys.

References 

Neighbourhoods of Vilnius